Ballot Access News is a United States-based website and monthly online and print newsletter edited and published by Richard Winger of San Francisco, California. Winger is an expert on ballot access law in the United States.

History
Published since 1985, the newsletter advocates "fair and equitable ballot access laws."

Ballot Access News reports on state and federal court decisions, compares American ballot access laws to those of other democratic nations, covers developments on electoral systems such as instant-runoff voting, and documents the number of votes independent and minor party candidates receive.  The newsletter also records the activities of the Coalition for Free and Open Elections, an interest group of minor party members and others working together on ballot access law reform issues.

References

External links
 Ballot Access News, official site
 Coalition on Free and Open Elections, official site

1985 establishments in California
Election and voting-related organizations
Magazines established in 1985
Magazines published in San Francisco
Monthly magazines published in the United States
Newsletters
Online magazines published in the United States
Political magazines published in the United States